Curren may refer to
Curren (name)
Toyota Curren, a Japanese automobile
Curren Chan (foaled 2007), Japanese Thoroughbred racehorse

See also
Curran (disambiguation)